Dietra Yvette Trent (born December 17, 1963) served as the Virginia Secretary of Education under Governor Terry McAuliffe. She previously served as Deputy Secretary of Education from 2006 to 2010 and again from 2014 to 2016 and was elevated after Anne Holton's resignation as Secretary to campaign for her husband, Tim Kaine's vice presidential bid in 2016.

References

External links
 Virginia Secretary of Education

Living people
1963 births
State cabinet secretaries of Virginia
Virginia Democrats
African-American people in Virginia politics
Women in Virginia politics
African-American women in politics
African-American state cabinet secretaries
Hampton University alumni
Virginia Commonwealth University alumni
People from Halifax County, Virginia
21st-century American politicians
21st-century American women politicians
21st-century African-American women
21st-century African-American politicians
20th-century African-American people
20th-century African-American women